Orientate (foaled March 29, 1999 in Kentucky) is an American Thoroughbred racehorse who won the 2002 Breeder's Cup Sprint and was voted the U.S. Champion Sprint Horse of 2002.

A descendant of the great Nearco through his son Royal Charger, Orientate was bred by Gainesway Thoroughbreds Ltd. and raced by Bob & Beverly Lewis. He was sired by American multiple stakes winner Mt. Livermore and out of the Cox's Ridge mare, Dream Team.

Trained by U.S. Racing Hall of Fame inductee D. Wayne Lukas,  Orientate retired from racing having won ten of his nineteen starts with earnings of US$1,716,950.

At stud
Purchased by Gainesway in partnership with Arrowfield Stud of Australia, Orientate was sent to stand at stud at Gainesway Farm near Lexington, Kentucky. Among his successful racing offspring to date includes American Grade I winner Lady Joanne and the Australian Grade II winner, Marveen.

Pedigree

References

1999 racehorse births
Racehorses bred in Kentucky
Racehorses trained in the United States
Eclipse Award winners
Breeders' Cup Sprint winners
Thoroughbred family 16-g